Jeremiah McKinnon (born June 29, 1993) is a former American football cornerback. He played college football at Florida International.

Professional career

Dallas Cowboys
McKinnon signed with the Dallas Cowboys as an undrafted free agent on May 6, 2016. He was waived by the Cowboys on August 29, 2016.

Tennessee Titans
On November 15, 2016, McKinnon was signed to the Tennessee Titans' practice squad.

Dallas Cowboys (second stint)
On January 16, 2017, McKinnon signed a reserve/future contract with the Cowboys. He was released on July 20, 2017.

Washington Redskins
On July 29, 2017, McKinnon was signed by the Washington Redskins. He was waived on September 2, 2017.

New York Giants
On November 28, 2017, McKinnon was signed to the New York Giants' practice squad. He signed a reserve/future contract with the Giants on January 1, 2018. He was waived on June 4, 2018.

Cleveland Browns
On July 30, 2018, McKinnon signed with the Cleveland Browns. On September 2, 2018, McKinnon was waived by the Browns and was signed to the practice squad the next day. McKinnon was promoted to the active roster on October 2, 2018. McKinnon was waived by the Browns on October 9, 2018, two days after making his NFL debut against the Baltimore Ravens. He was subsequently re-signed by the Browns to their practice squad the next day. He was released from the Browns' practice squad on October 13, 2018.

Philadelphia Eagles
On November 20, 2018, McKinnon was signed to the Philadelphia Eagles practice squad.

McKinnon signed a reserve/future contract with the Eagles on January 14, 2019. He was waived during final roster cuts on August 30, 2019.

New York Guardians
In October 2019, McKinnon was selected by the New York Guardians in the 2020 XFL Draft. He signed a contract with the team on February 10, 2020. He had his contract terminated when the league suspended operations on April 10, 2020.

Personal life
Jeremiah is cousin to Richard Leonard, who currently plays cornerback for the Calgary Stampeders and former Arena Football League player Cedric McKinnon.

References

External links
FIU Panthers bio

1993 births
Living people
American football cornerbacks
FIU Panthers football players
Dallas Cowboys players
Tennessee Titans players
Washington Redskins players
New York Giants players
Cleveland Browns players
Philadelphia Eagles players
Players of American football from Miami
Miami Southridge Senior High School alumni
New York Guardians players